Sven Folke Tisell (22 June 1909 – 5 November 1972) was a Swedish rowing coxswain. He competed in the coxed fours at the 1936 Summer Olympics, but failed to reach the final.

References

1909 births
1972 deaths
Swedish male rowers
Olympic rowers of Sweden
Rowers at the 1936 Summer Olympics
Coxswains (rowing)